Louis Duerloo (7 July 1910 – 30 September 1977) was a Belgian racing cyclist. He won the Belgian national road race title in 1933 and the Tour of Flanders in 1935.

References

External links
 

1910 births
1977 deaths
Belgian male cyclists
People from Essen, Belgium
Cyclists from Antwerp Province